Consistency Theory is the second and final studio album by Australian hip-hop group 1200 Techniques. Released on 9 January 2004, it sees the group moving away from the diverse influences of their first album, to a more straightforward, arguably commercial hip-hop sound. The album  peaked at No. 38 on the ARIA Albums Chart.

Track listing
 "Kem's Theme (Intro)"
 "B-boy Shit"
 "Eye of the Storm"
 "Knock Knock" (featuring Koolism)
 "Skit 01 - George da Gangsta"
 "The Word" (featuring Krondon)
 "Where Ur At"
 "Hot Syrup"
 "Looking Back 'Nothin but Love'" (featuring Motion Man)
 "Welcome Aboard - 1200 Techniquians"
 "Takin' You Back"
 "Feel the Music" (featuring Maya Jupiter)
 "Skit 02 - Robbo"
 "Haterade" (featuring Rodney P & Ken Hell)
 "Fork in the Road" (featuring Rashad Haughton)
 "Consistency Theory" (featuring Kristin)
 "U Can Make It"
 "Got 2 Survive"

 Limited Edition DVD
 "1200's Theme" (Live at The Big Day Out 2003)	
 "Since I Got It" (Live at The Big Day Out 2003)	
 "Can't Stop" (Live at The Big Day Out 2003)	
 "Put 'Em Up" (Live at The Big Day Out 2003)	
 "B-Boy Shit" (Live at The Big Day Out 2003)	
 "Freestyle Jam" (Live at The Big Day Out 2003)	
 "Karma" (Live at The Big Day Out 2003)	
 "Hard As Hell" (Live at The Big Day Out 2003)	
 "Battlemaster" (Live at The Big Day Out 2003)	
 "Eye of the Storm" (Video Clip)

Charts

Release history

References 

1200 Techniques albums
2004 albums